is a Japanese manufacturer of brake components for automobiles, motorcycles, trains, and industrial machinery.

The company was founded by Sanji Osame in 1929 as Akebono Sekimen Kogyosho as a response to the demand by the Japan Army Authority for ground transport; its first products were brake linings used by the government entity. Today it is now a large company with a significant overseas presence and wide range of brake products for many applications.

Business locations
In addition to its headquarters in Hanyū; and Nihonbashi, it also has facilities in other locations in Japan, such as Fukushima.

In the United States, it has facilities in Elizabethtown, Kentucky; Farmington Hills, Michigan; Columbia, South Carolina; Glasgow, Kentucky; and Clarksville, Tennessee.

In China, it has plants in Guangzhou and Suzhou. In Indonesia and Vietnam, it has a partnership with Astra.

In Europe, it has facilities in Arras and Gonesse in France, and also has a UK presence for its work with the McLaren Formula 1 team. Its main European facility in Trenčín is focused on production of high-performance aluminium brake calipers.

Automotive brakes
Akebondo offers products mainly on an OEM basis for automobile manufacturers. Its main OEM customers include Japanese car manufacturers such as Toyota, Nissan, Honda, Mitsubishi, Subaru, and Isuzu. The company also supplies products to global automakers like Porsche, Audi, GM, Ford, and Mercedes-Benz.

Motorsport

Beginning with the 2007 Formula One season, Akebono has been a technology partner to the McLaren F1 team. Since 2013, Akebono has also supplied brake components to the Toyota WEC team.

References

External links

  

Manufacturing companies of Japan
Automotive companies of Japan
Companies based in Saitama Prefecture
Manufacturing companies based in Tokyo
Companies listed on the Tokyo Stock Exchange
Manufacturing companies established in 1929
Japanese brands
Japanese companies established in 1929